Jef is a Dutch-language masculine given name primarily used in Belgium. It is a short form of Jozef/Josef, used also in Breton. People with the name include:

Jef Billings (born 1945), American figure skating costume designer
Jef Boeke (born 1950s), American geneticist
Jef Bruyninckx (1919–1995), Belgian film actor, editor and director
Jef Caers (born 1970s), Belgian geostatistician
Jef Colruyt (born 1958), Belgian businessman
Jef Delen (born 1976), Belgian footballer
Jef Demuysere (1907–1969), Belgian cyclist
Jef Denyn (1862–1941), Belgian carillon player
Jef Dutilleux (1876–1960), Belgian painter
Jef Elbers (born 1947), Belgian singer, script writer, and political activist
Jef François (1901–1996), Belgian Nazi collaborator
Jef Gaitan (born 1986), Filipino actress 
Jef Geeraerts (1930–2015), Belgian writer
Jef Geys (1934-2018), Belgian artist
Jef Gilson (1926–2012), French pianist, arranger, composer and big band leader
Jef Jurion (born 1937), Belgian footballer
Jef Labes, American keyboardist
Jef Lahaye (1932–1990), Dutch cyclist
Jef Lambeaux (1852–1908), Belgian sculptor 
Jef Last (1898–1972), Dutch poet, writer, translator and cosmopolitan
Jef Lataster (1922–2014), Dutch long-distance runner
Jef Leempoels (1867–1935), Belgian painter
Jef Lowagie (1903–1985), Belgian cyclist
Jef Maes (1905–1996), Belgian composer and violist
Jef Mallett (born 1962), American comics artist
Jef Martens (born 1975), Belgian DJ known as "Basto"
Jef McAllister (born 1956), American journalist, author and lawyer
Jef Mermans (1922–1996), Belgian footballer
Jef Murray (1960–2015), American fantasy artist and author 
Jef Neve (born 1977), Belgian pianist and composer
Jef Nys (1927–2009), Belgian comic book creator
Jef Planckaert (1934–2007), Belgian cyclist
Jef Raskin (1943–2005), American human–computer interface expert
Jef Scherens (1909–1986), Belgian cyclist
Jef Tavernier (born 1951), Belgian politician
Jef Valkeniers (born 1932), Belgian physician-neuropsychiatrist and politician
Jef Van Campen (born 1934), Belgian post-impressionistic painter
Jef Van Damme (born 1979), Belgian politician
Jef van de Wiele (1903–1979), Belgian Nazi politician
Jef Van Der Linden (1927–2008), Belgian footballer
Jef Van der Veken (1872–1964), Belgian art restorer, copyist and art forger
Jef Van Gool (born 1935), Belgian footballer
Jef van Hoof (1886–1959), Belgian composer and conductor
Jef Van Meirhaeghe (born 1992), Belgian cyclist
Jef Vliers (1932–1995), Belgian footballer

Breton short name 
Jef Le Penven (1919–1967), Breton composer
Jef Aérosol (born in 1957), Breton graffiti artist

See also
Jeff

Dutch masculine given names